Javier Ruiz Rueda (March 18, 1909 – September 8, 1993) was a Mexican composer and writer. He was born in Mexico City.

Achievements
Javier Ruiz Rueda was part of the great composers alongside Agustín Lara. His major musical works include Cosas del Amor and Dulce Aventura, for which he composed the music and José Antonio Zorrilla wrote the lyrics.

Javier Ruiz Rueda also wrote jingles for radio; probably the most popular jingle is "Estaban los tomatitos ..." for which he composed the music and Ramiro Gamboa wrote the lyrics.

In the 1940s Soledad Orozco, wife of President Manuel Avila Camacho became active in the “League of Decency”, a censorious conservative group that campaigned against indecency. The popular bolero was one of its targets, because of lyrics the League considered scandalous. Javier Ruiz Rueda was one of their targets and they succeeded in having one of his songs banned.

He co-wrote, with José Antonio Zorrilla, the song ¿Qué pasa mi cuate? recorded by Pedro Infante in 1946. He also co-wrote the screenplay for the 1950 film El Amor No Es Negocio.

Literary achievements
Javier Ruiz Rueda worked with many composers and was friend to many of them. His passion for history and writing led him to write a biography of Agustín Lara: "Agustín Lara: Vida y Pasiones".

Last years
Javier Ruiz Rueda died on September 8, 1993.

References

1909 births
1993 deaths
Mexican musicians
Mexican songwriters
Male songwriters
Musicians from Mexico City
20th-century male musicians